Antoine Pinay (30 December 1891 – 13 December 1994) was a French conservative politician who served as Prime Minister of France from 1952 to 1953.

Life
Antoine Pinay was born on 30 December 1891 in Saint-Symphorien-sur-Coise. He was a child of Claude Pinay (5 July 1852 – 4 March 1919), and his wife, Marie Antoinette Besson (10 October 1861 – 23 November 1936).

On 25 April 1917, Pinay married Marguerite Fouletier (3 June 1895 – 3 December 1970) and had two daughters and one son, Geneviève (1918–2017), Odette (1920–2015), and Pierre (1922–1964).

As a young man, Pinay fought in World War I and injured his arm so that it was paralyzed for the rest of his life.

After the war, he managed a small business and in 1929 he was elected mayor of Saint-Chamond, Loire.

He was elected to the Chamber of Deputies in 1936, running as an independent candidate opposed to the Popular Front. In 1938 he was elected to the Senate, where he joined the Independent Radicals. On 10 July 1940 he voted to give the Cabinet presided over by Marshal Philippe Pétain authority to draw up a new constitution, effectively ending the French Third Republic and establishing Vichy France. In 1941, Antoine Pinay was appointed to the Conseil National of the Vichy regime. He was also awarded the Order of the Francisque. During the occupation, Antoine Pinay remained mayor of Saint-Chamond, although he had been urged by General Georges to move to Algiers, in order to better protect the residents of this city. Pinay resigned from the Conseil National within a few months and refused any official position with the Vichy regime, such as the préfecture de l'Hérault offered by Laval. He also gave several hundreds of identity papers to help Jews and members of the Resistance flee from France to Algiers or Switzerland. An official commission in 1946 recognized his long lasting opposition to the Nazis and the help he gave to the Resistance and released him without charge.

In 1944, he was first placed on house arrest, and stripped of his right to be candidate to an election on 5 September 1945. After the intervention of René Cassin, the vice-president of the Conseil d'État, who pointed to his fierce opposition to the German occupation, his citizen rights were restored on 5 October 1945. On 2 June 1946, he could successfully run for election to the Assemblée Constituante as a moderate candidate.

He helped create a conservative party, the National Center of Independents and Peasants (CNIP). He acquired the reputation as one of France's more spirited politicians and in 1952 became prime minister by virtue of being the most popular elected CNIP official. His ministry was seen as the return of the "classical right", discredited since the Liberation. He stabilized the finances of the French nation and the French currency.

In 1955, he was one of the participants of the Messina Conference, which would lead to the Treaty of Rome in 1957.

During the May 1958 crisis precipitated by the Algerian war, he supported Charles de Gaulle's return to power and approved of the Fifth Republic's constitution. He served as finance minister until 1960. In 1973, he was made médiateur de la République (ombudsman) by President Georges Pompidou.

He died 17 days before his 103rd birthday, and was buried in Saint-Symphorien-sur-Coise. From 14 December 1990, when former Republic of China Premier Zhang Qun died until his own death, Pinay was the world's oldest living former head of government.

Pinay's ministry, 8 March 1952 – 8 January 1953
 Antoine Pinay – President of the Council and Minister of Finance and Economic Affairs
 Henri Queuille – Vice President of the Council
 Robert Schuman – Minister of Foreign Affairs
 René Pleven – Minister of National Defense
 Charles Brune – Minister of the Interior
 Jean-Marie Louvel – Minister of Commerce and Energy
 Pierre Garet – Minister of Labour and Social Security
 Léon Martinaud-Deplat – Minister of Justice
 Pierre-Olivier Lapie – Minister of National Education
 Emmanuel Temple – Minister of Veterans and War Victims
 Camille Laurens – Minister of Agriculture
 Pierre Pflimlin – Minister of Overseas France
 André Morice – Minister of Public Works, Transport, and Tourism
 Paul Ribeyre – Minister of Public Health and Population
 Eugène Claudius-Petit – Minister of Reconstruction and Town Planning
 Roger Duchet – Minister of Posts
 Jean Letourneau – Minister of Relations with Partner States

Changes
 11 August 1952 – André Marie succeeds Lapie as Minister of National Education.

References

Further reading

 
 Morris, Peter. "Homo politicus; the political careers of Pierre Pflimlin and Jacques Chaban‐Delmas." Modern & Contemporary France 1.1 (1993): 42–44.

1891 births
1994 deaths
People from Rhône (department)
Politicians from Auvergne-Rhône-Alpes
Independent Radical politicians
National Centre of Independents and Peasants politicians
Prime Ministers of France
French Ministers of Finance
French Foreign Ministers
Transport ministers of France
Ombudsmen in France
Members of the 16th Chamber of Deputies of the French Third Republic
French Senators of the Third Republic
Senators of Loire (department)
Members of the Constituent Assembly of France (1946)
Deputies of the 1st National Assembly of the French Fourth Republic
Deputies of the 2nd National Assembly of the French Fourth Republic
Deputies of the 3rd National Assembly of the French Fourth Republic
Deputies of the 1st National Assembly of the French Fifth Republic
French politicians with disabilities
French centenarians
French military personnel of World War I
French people of the Algerian War
Légion d'honneur refusals
Order of the Francisque recipients
Men centenarians